Harry Powell may refer to:

 Reverend Harry Powell, a fictional character in Davis Grubb's 1953 novel The Night of the Hunter
 Harry Powell (footballer) (1878–1930), Australian rules footballer
 Harry James Powell (1853–1922), British glassmaker
 Harry Powell (cricketer), Welsh cricketer
 Harry Powell (bowls), English lawn bowler

See also
Henry Powell (disambiguation)
Harold Powell (disambiguation)